The 1943 Denver Pioneers football team was an American football team that represented the University of Denver as member of the Mountain States Conference during the 1943 college football season. In their first and only season under head coach Mark Duncan, the Pioneers compiled a 2–5 record and were outscored by a total of 186 to 70.

Schedule

References

Denver
Denver Pioneers football seasons
Denver Pioneers football